Paragoniastrea is a genus of stony corals in the family Merulinidae.

Species 
The following species are currently recognized by the World Register of Marine Species:

 Paragoniastrea australensis (Milne Edwards, 1857)
 Paragoniastrea deformis (Veron, 1990)
 Paragoniastrea russelli (Wells, 1954)

References 

Merulinidae
Scleractinia genera